Ivan Bosiljčić (born 15 January 1979) is a Serbian film, television, and theatre actor. He is popular for his leading roles in numerous television and cinematographic roles, as well as in theatrical musicals.

Early life 
Ivan was born on 15 January 1979 in Titovo Užice, Serbia, Yugoslavia. During high school, he showed musical talent and he set up his own band, Rok Apoteka.

Upon completing high school, Bošiljčić moved to Novi Sad to attend the Academy of Arts under Vida Ognjenović in 2001. He later moved to Belgrade to pursue his acting career.

Career 
His first acting work was to provide the voices (dubbed in Serbian) for children's animated programs such as Teenage Mutant Ninja Turtles for the part of Donatello and in Yu-Gi-Oh! as Joey Wheeler. His first major role occurred in 2004 when he starred in a television film produced by the Radio Television of Serbia named "O štetnosti duvana" (About the dangers of tobacco). National interest came after Bosiljčić acted in Stižu dolari (The dollars are coming). He appeared in both seasons one and two as a young accountant.

Mostly a musical theater actor, some of his more well-known roles include "Cigani lete u nebo (Gypsies fly in the sky), Kiss me Kate, Chicago, Svetlosti pozornice (Stage Lights) and A Chorus Line. All of these are performed at the Theatre on Terazije. He also stars in the emotional drama "Jasmin na stranputici" (Jasmin on the crossroads) in the Slavija Theatre in Belgrade.

In 2007 he became a regular in the famous musical Les Misérables at the Belgrade Madlenianum Opera House, while in 2012 he starred in te musical Rebecca in the same opera. Some other theatre productions he has appeared in are "Hamlet", "Bogojavljanska noć" (for which he received an award for the best young actor), "Mileva Einstein" and "Brzina tame" (The speed of the night). Bosiljčić also starred in the Theatre on Terazije production of "Maratonci trče počasni krug", which opened in May 2008. He is playing the role of Mirko Topalović.

Bosiljčić acted in the popular RTS shows Bela Lađa (White Ship) and Ranjeni Orao (Wounded Eagle), where he was one of the main characters. In 2015 and 2016, he starred in the TV Prva remake of ER, Urgentni Centar (lit. Emergency Center) as Dr. Arsić, a role identical to Doug Ross, played by George Clooney. He has also had previous television roles as Nenad Aleksić in Ranjeni Orao and Bojan Lazarević in Ljubav i mržnja. He has also had minor role in the film "Spleen" produced by an Italian film maker with an Italian crew as well as Serbian movies "Strah od letenja" (Fear of flying) and "Moné".

Personal life 

In 2006 Bosiljčić completed compulsory military service, which was mandatory in Serbia at the time. He is married to renown Serbian singer Jelena Tomašević of international career; the couple had a girl named Ninoslava, born on 24 January 2012. He is fluent in English and Russian.

Filmography

Film

Television

Stage

Serbian movie voice dubs

Serbian television voice dubs

Awards 
 Best Young Actor for the role of Feste in Twelfth Night, Theater encounters Joakim Vujić Award (2000)
 "Zoran's mustache" award for acting bravura in "Don Krsto" for the role of Trip, the Days of Zoran Radmilovića in Zaječar (2007)
 Best New Artist for the role of Vasil in the film "On the Beautiful Blue Danube". For the same role won the Audience Award and the Award of journalists, Film Festival "Filmski susreti", Niš (2008)
 Best Young Actor for the role Mirko Topalovic in "Maratonci trče počasni krug musical, Days of Comedy in Jagodina (2009).
 Acting couple of the year award Ivan Bosiljčić and Sloboda Mićalović, Ranjeni orao, Film Festival "Filmski susreti", Niš (2009)
 Acting couple of the year award Ivan Bosiljčić and Ivana Jovanović, Greh njene majke, Film Festival "Filmski susreti", Niš (2010)
 Annual Award of Terazije Theatre for the role of Don Jere in "Gloria" (2010)
 Acting couple of the year award Ivan Bosiljčić and Sloboda Mićalović, Nepobedivo srce, Film Festival "Filmski susreti", Niš (2012)
 Sterija award for acting performance in the role of Mane in the musical Zona Zamfirova (2013).
 "Golden Turkey" for best actor for role Branko in "Izbiračica" at 43. Days of Comedy in Jagodina (2014).

References

External links

 
 
 Ivan Bosiljčić on National Theatre of Serbia website

1979 births
Serbian male actors
Living people
People from Užice
Serbian male Shakespearean actors
Serbian male stage actors
Serbian male film actors
Serbian male voice actors
Serbian male television actors
Serbian baritones
Male musical theatre actors
Zoran Radmilović Award winners
Indexi Award winners